Jayankondam is a state assembly constituency in Ariyalur district in Tamil Nadu. Its State Assembly Constituency number is 150. It falls under Chidambaram parliamentary constituency. It is one of the 234 State Legislative Assembly Constituencies in Tamil Nadu, in India.

Most successful party: DMK (6 times)

Madras State

Tamil Nadu

Demographics

Election results

2021

2016

2011

2006

2001

1996

1991

1989

1984

1980

1977

1971

1967

1962

1957

1952

References 

 

Assembly constituencies of Tamil Nadu
Ariyalur district